Sir Samuel Servington Savery (March 1861 – 27 December 1938)  was a British Conservative Party politician who served as the Member of Parliament (MP) for Holderness from 1923 to 1938. He was also founder and the first Headmaster of Bramcote School, Scarborough.

Early life and education
Savery was born in Oxford the son of Rev. George Savery. He was educated at Kingswood School in Bath, Somerset. He obtained a Master of Arts from Christ Church, Oxford before going to Scarborough, North Yorkshire and founding Bramcote Preparatory School.

Political career
During his career he was a member of Holderness County Council, North Riding County Council and was also a Justice of the Peace in Scarborough.

Savery was elected Chairman of the Scarborough and Whitby Conservative Association, although he was eventually chosen by Holderness Conservative Association to contest the 1923 general election for that constituency. At the 1923 general election he was elected Member of Parliament (MP) for Holderness. He defeated the Liberal Party incumbent, Audley Bowdler, who had enacted the first change of party allegiance of the constituency in its history. He held the seat until his death in 1938, aged 77. In 1937, Savery was knighted for "public and political services."

Death
Until his death, Savery's age was a mystery with Debrett's giving his age as "Born 18..." and Whitaker's Almanack simply as "Born..." Several hours after his death, however, his age, which was 77, was revealed to the world.

References

1861 births
1938 deaths
Conservative Party (UK) MPs for English constituencies
UK MPs 1923–1924
UK MPs 1924–1929
UK MPs 1929–1931
UK MPs 1931–1935
UK MPs 1935–1945
People from Oxford
Politicians from Scarborough, North Yorkshire